Donald Chisholm (born April 14, 1976 in Antigonish, Nova Scotia) is a Canadian professional racing driver. Chisholm currently drives the No. 89 Keltic Ford/Nova Construction Ford Fusion for NOVA Racing in the Parts For Trucks Pro Stock Tour and part-time in NASCAR Pinty's Series driving the No. 89 NOVA Racing Ford Fusion.

Racing career

Maritime Pro Stock Tour

In 2015 Chisholm came into the season with hopes of capturing his first Pro Stock Tour championship. Despite picking up just one win in the Lucas Oil 150 at Riverside International Speedway, Chisholm put together one of the most consistent performances of his career. He would record eight top five finishes, along with eleven top tens in twelve starts to capture the title by just nine points over 2nd place Dylan Blenkhorn.

NASCAR Canadian Tire Series

Donald Chisholm made his NASCAR Canadian Tire Series debut at Riverside International Speedway, his hometown track, in 2007. He was forced to retire with steering issues on lap 243, finishing a disappointing 16th. He returned to Riverside the following season, but didn't fare much better, finishing the race in 14th. Chisholm added a second race to his schedule in 2008, finishing all the laps at Kawartha Speedway on his way to a 10th-place finish for his first career top 10.

Chisholm picked up his first career pole at the 2014 Wilson Equipment 300 at Riverside with a speed of 82.443 mph. He would go on to lead 103 laps in the event to pick up his first career win, beating out series regular Andrew Ranger who faded late after leading 106 laps to finish 4th. The win was an emotional one for the Chisholm Family as Donald lost his father, John "Nova" Chisholm, earlier in the year.

Personal life

Donald is the son of entrepreneur and philanthropist John Chisholm. John built Riverside International Speedway in 1969 and repurchased the track in 2005, renovating it into its current state. John Chisholm was inducted into the Canadian Motorsports Hall of Fame in 2015.

Motorsports career results

NASCAR
(key) (Bold – Pole position awarded by qualifying time. Italics – Pole position earned by points standings or practice time. * – Most laps led.)

Pinty's Series

Maritime Pro Stock Tour

Parts For Trucks Pro Stock Tour

1Race delayed due to weather and held later in the season than shown.

2Race cancelled and combined with Round 7

IWK 250 results

  Event run as part of the Pro All Stars Series

References

1976 births
Canadian racing drivers
Living people
People from Antigonish, Nova Scotia
Racing drivers from Nova Scotia
NASCAR drivers